The Communist Party of Swaziland (CPS) is a Swazi communist party founded on 9 April 2011. It was banned by the Swazi king, Mswati III, shortly after its foundation, and operates clandestinely. The party is headquartered in Kamhlushwa, South Africa.

The party describes itself as democratic, anti-racist and anti-sexist. It aims to, among other things, give all political parties in Eswatini legal status, abolish the current absolute monarchy, establish a democratic system of government and new constitution, ensure freedom of assembly and the press, allow for the safe return of exiles, and safeguard workers' rights to organize and unionize.

The party is active in the 2021 Eswatini protests.

References

External links 
 

Banned communist parties
Political parties in Eswatini
Communist parties in Africa
Political parties established in 2011
2011 establishments in Swaziland
Socialism in Eswatini